Haniifa Mohamed Ibrahim (born 25 June 1991) is a Somalian Minister of Women and Human Rights Development.

Life
She was born in 1991 and she became a member of Somalia's parliament.

In 2017 she was part of the 17 strong group of politicians drawn from Somalia's lower and upper houses of parliament whose task was to choose Somalia's president. She became the Minister of Women and Human Rights Development under Prime Minister Abdihakin Ashkir in Somalia.

In 2021 she opened a centre in Mogadishu to support women. This was in support of the target to get 30% women in politics. In discussion with UN envoy James C. Swan she raised the issue of United Nations support for the 30% target in 2021.

References

1991 births
Living people
Somalian politicians